Kopar is a Lower Sepik language of Marienberg Rural LLG, East Sepik Province, Papua New Guinea.

Distribution
The Kopar language is spoken in Kopar village, Marienberg Rural LLG, East Sepik Province. It is also spoken in the villages of Wongan and Singrin.

Status
Kopar is a moribund language. It has historically influenced Tayap, a language isolate.

References

Languages of East Sepik Province
Lower Sepik languages